Apantesis quenseli, the Labrador tiger moth, is a moth of the family Erebidae. They are also present in Northern Scandinavia. It is widely distributed in Polar Eurasia, mountains of Siberia, Mongolia, North China, Japan (Mt. Daisetsu on Hokkaido), Polar North America.

The larvae feed on Alchemilla alpina and Plantago alpina.

This species was formerly a member of the genus Grammia, but was moved to Apantesis along with the other species of the genera Grammia, Holarctia, and Notarctia.

Subspecies
Apantesis quenseli gelida (Möschler, 1848)
Apantesis quenseli liturata (Ménétriès, 1859)
Apantesis quenseli quenseli (Paykull, 1793)
Apantesis quenseli saura Dubatolov, 2007 (Kazakhstan)
Apantesis quenseli zamolodchikovi Saldaitis & Ivinskis, 2001 (Russia: Wrangel Island)
Apantesis quenseli daisetsuzana  (Matsumura, 1927)  (Japan: Mt. Daisetsu)

References

External links

Moths and Butterflies of Europe and North Africa
Fauna Europaea

Arctiina
Moths described in 1791
Moths of Japan
Moths of Europe
Taxa named by Gustaf von Paykull
Moths of North America
Moths of Asia